Fahad al-Ateeq is a Saudi short story writer and novelist.

Born in Riyadh, Fahad al-Ateeq has published 5 collections of short stories and a novel. He started writing short stories for Lotus Magazine, the Afro-Asian literary magazine. His stories have been translated into both French and English. He has also appeared in the literary magazine Banipal.

Works
 Life on Hold, 2012. Translated from the Arabic كائن مؤجل by Jonathan Wright. Extract translated by Kathryn Stapley, in Banipal 34: The World of Arab Fiction.

References

Year of birth missing (living people)
Living people
Saudi Arabian novelists
Saudi Arabian short story writers